Burmah Oil Company Ltd v Lord Advocate [1965] AC 75, was a court case, raised in Scotland, and decided ultimately in the House of Lords.  The case is an important decision in British constitutional law and had unusual legal repercussions at the time.

Facts

This case concerned the destruction of oil fields in Burma belonging to the Burmah Oil Company by British forces during the Japanese invasion of Burma in 1942. The destruction was ordered in order to prevent the installations from falling into the hands of the advancing Imperial Japanese Army. Burmah Oil brought an action against the UK government, represented by the Lord Advocate.

In the Outer House of the Court of Session, Lord Kilbrandon found in favour of Burmah Oil. The Crown appealed, and the First Division of the Inner House of the Court of Session unanimously reversed the decision below. Burmah Oil then appealed to the House of Lords.

Judgment
The House of Lords held by a 3–2 majority that although the damage was lawful, it was the equivalent of requisitioning the property.  Any act of requisition was done for the good of the public, at the expense of the individual proprietor, and for that reason, the proprietor should be compensated from public funds. Viscount Radcliffe and Lord Hodson dissented.

Significance
In the end, the result was frustrated by the passing of a retroactive Act of Parliament, the War Damage Act 1965, which retroactively exempts the Crown from liability in respect of damage to, or destruction of, property caused by acts lawfully done by the Crown during, or in contemplation of the outbreak of, a war in which it is engaged.

See also
UK company law
UK public services law

References

1965 in Scotland
House of Lords cases
Court of Session cases
1965 in case law
Burmah-Castrol
United Kingdom administrative case law
1965 in the environment
1965 in British law
United Kingdom constitutional case law